The 2010–11 Indonesia Super League U-21 season will be the third edition of Indonesia Super League U-21 (ISL U-21), a companion competition Indonesian super league that are intended for footballers under the age of twenty-one years.

Persib U-21 is the defending champion in this season. Djarum, an Indonesian tobacco company will continue its participation as the competition's main sponsor.

Format 
The competition is divided into three acts consist of two round the group and knockout round. The first round is divided into three groups each containing six clubs, two top teams of each group advanced to the second round. The second half consisted of two groups containing three teams in each group intended, the two best teams from each group advanced to the semifinals. The winner advanced to the final semi-final, while two teams who defeated third-ranked fight. Final winner becomes the champion.

Promotion and relegation 
Teams promoted to ISL U-21
 Persibo U-21
 Deltras Sidoarjo U-21
 Semen Padang U-21

Teams relegated
 Persitara U-21
 Persebaya Surabaya U-21 (Previous 4th place)
 Persik Kediri U-21

Round and draw dates 
All draws held at PSSI headquarters in Jakarta, Indonesia unless stated otherwise.

First round 

PSM Makassar U-21, Persema U-21 and Persibo U-21 withdrawn after the main team of the three U-21 team was withdrawn from Indonesia Super League. Group winners and runners-up advanced to the second group stage.

Group 1

Group 2

Group 3

Second round 

Qualify teams: Persib Bandung U-21 and Semen Padang U-21 (Group 1), Pelita Jaya U-21 and Persela U-21 (Group 2), Persisam Putra U-21 and Persiwa Wamena U-21 (Group 3).

All match play in GMSB Stadium. The draw for this Round took place on 21 April 2011 with ties to be played on the weekend of 26–30 April 2011. Group winners and runners-up advanced to the knockout round.

Group A

Group B

Knockout round

Semifinal

Third placed

Final 
2011 Indonesia Super League U-21 Final

Winner

Awards

Top goalscorers 
Including matches played on 26 March 2011

References

External links 
 Indonesia Super League standings (including U-21 ISL)

 
Indonesia Super League U-21 seasons
U
U21